The Glorious Revolution is the third and last album (EP) by the American Rock band Grey Holiday released in 2009.

Recording 
The album was recorded at Darkhorse Studios in Franklin, TN, over ten days, By Rusty Varenkamp.

Track listing

Enhanced Contents
The enhanced CD contains two music videos, with video clips and other features:

"Where You Want Me"
"You Belong To Me"

Personnel
 Matthew Minor: vocals, piano, guitars
 Steven Bedingfield: guitars
 R.T. Bodet: bass
 Joshua Fenoglio: drums
 Brett Vargason: drums

References

External links
Official website

2009 EPs